Mikhail Viktorovich Panshin (born May 2, 1983) a Kazakhstani-Russian professional ice hockey forward who currently plays for Barys Astana of the Kontinental Hockey League (KHL).

International
Panshin was named to the Kazakhstan men's national ice hockey team for competition at the 2014 IIHF World Championship.

References

External links

1983 births
Living people
Russian ice hockey forwards
Kazakhstani ice hockey players
SKA Saint Petersburg players
HC Vityaz players
Amur Khabarovsk players
Atlant Moscow Oblast players
Beibarys Atyrau players
Yertis Pavlodar players
Barys Nur-Sultan players
People from Cherepovets
Sportspeople from Vologda Oblast